Gastone Medin (1905–1973) was an Italian art director. He worked on more than a hundred and fifty films during his career.

Selected filmography

 Figaro and His Great Day (1931)
 Lowered Sails (1931)
 The Table of the Poor (1932)
 La Wally (1932)
 The Last Adventure (1932)
 What Scoundrels Men Are! (1932)
 Your Money or Your Life (1932)
 Fanny (1933)
 Giallo (1933)
 Together in the Dark (1933)
 Stadium (1934)
 The Wedding March (1934)
 Full Speed (1934)
 I Love You Only (1935)
 Golden Arrow (1935)
 Joe the Red (1936)
 The Carnival Is Here Again (1937)
 The Two Mothers (1938)
 I Want to Live with Letizia (1938)
 The Document (1939)
 Frenzy (1939)
 Heartbeat (1939)
 Backstage (1939)
 A Romantic Adventure (1940)
 Two on a Vacation (1940)
 The Happy Ghost (1941)
 The Taming of the Shrew (1942)
 Love Story (1942)
 Farewell Love! (1943)
 The Innocent Casimiro (1945)
 Eugenia Grandet (1946)
 Fire Over the Sea (1947)
 The Lady of the Camellias (1947)
 Christmas at Camp 119 (1948)
 The Force of Destiny (1950)
 His Last Twelve Hours (1951)
 Messalina (1951)
 Bread, Love and Dreams (1953)
 Fatal Desire (1953)
 Anna of Brooklyn (1958)

References

Bibliography
 Anile, Alberto. Orson Welles in Italy. Indiana University Press, 2013.

External links

1905 births
1973 deaths
Italian art directors
Film people from Split, Croatia
People from the Kingdom of Dalmatia